Robert Hiester Montgomery (September 21, 1872 – May 2, 1953) was an American accountant and educator. He also co-founded what is today the world's largest accounting firm, PricewaterhouseCoopers.

Montgomery was a two-term president of the American Institute of Certified Public Accountants (AICPA). Montgomery was the author of numerous books on auditing and taxation including Auditing Theory and Practice, a bestseller originally published in 1912 which is still in print today. He was successful in three professions despite his lack of formal education, having not even completed high school.

Life and work 
Montgomery quit school at the age of 14 and went to work in order to help out his family. In 1889 he got a job as an office boy at an accounting firm in Philadelphia. There he learned accounting and was made partner after seven years. Two years later in 1898, Montgomery and three of his colleagues, William M. Lybrand, Adam A. Ross Jr., and his brother T. Edward Ross, formed Lybrand, Ross Brothers & Montgomery. Two years later the firm opened an office in New York City under Montgomery's management. In his spare time Montgomery learned law. He was admitted to the New York Bar in 1904. Montgomery established his own law firm, Robert H. Montgomery, Attorney at Law, and worked on many difficult tax cases for clients. In 1905 Montgomery led a reorganization of the American Institute of Certified Public Accountants (AICPA). He created the Journal of Accountancy (then called the American Journal of Accounting). The first issue contained his Professional Standards. He was president of the AICPA for two two-year terms, first in 1912 and again in 1935.

Next, Montgomery also got into the field of education by developing a curriculum in accounting for Columbia University. He was hired as Columbia's first accounting professor in 1910 and stayed there until 1939.

Montgomery saw the need for a book on auditing. In 1912 he wrote Auditing: Theory and Practice. This was the first American book on auditing. For the seventh editions two other authors joined him and the book was retitled Montgomery's Auditing. After Montgomery's death the eighth edition was published in 1957 by two other authors. It is still in print and is now in its 12th edition.

Commissioned as a Lieutenant Colonel (1918) during World War I, he was generally referred to thereafter as Colonel Montgomery. He received the AICPA's Gold Medal Award in 1949.  In 1950, he was inducted into the Accounting Hall of Fame, in the first year of that award.

Montgomery was a highly respected leader of the profession of accountancy for over 60 years. His influence is still felt in the areas of auditing theory and practice, federal income taxation, professional accounting organizations, and accounting education.

Personal life

Montgomery lived in Greenwich, Connecticut, and commuted to work in New York City. He established a winter home in north Florida in 1927. He sold it and moved to the suburbs of Miami, Florida in 1930 to be in a more tropic area. Here he decided to collect palm trees. He built an estate which he called the Coconut Grove Palmetum on Old Cutler Drive about seven miles south of Coconut Grove. His love of tropical plants led him to establish a public garden. With the help of others he led the effort to establish Fairchild Tropical Garden in 1937, which opened to the public on March 23, 1938.

Legacy
In 1957, Cooper Brothers & Co (UK), McDonald, Currie and Co (Canada), and Lybrand, Ross Brothers & Montgomery (US) merged to form Coopers & Lybrand. For the rest of the century Coopers & Lybrand was known as one of the "Big Eight". On 1 July 1998 the worldwide merger of Price Waterhouse and Coopers & Lybrand created the current PricewaterhouseCoopers. PricewaterhouseCoopers is the world's largest professional services firm measured by revenues and one of the "Big Four" accountancy firms.

Montgomery established a collection of pine trees at his home in Greenwich, CT. In 1953 he donated his estate to the town and it is now a 102-acre park in the center of Greenwich. In commemoration of his donation a cultivar of the Colorado spruce was named Picea pungens 'Montgomery'  in his honor.

Montgomery collected manuscript account books and documents which illustrate and document the history of accounting and business procedures from the 14th century into the 20th century. He donated his collection to Columbia University in 1926. These books constitute the Montgomery Collection at the Rare Book and Manuscript Library in the Butler Library at Columbia University. The materials from his collection were featured in a 1987 Rare Book and Manuscript exhibit at Columbia entitled "The Origins of a Great Profession."

The Montgomery Botanical Center was established in 1959 by Nell Montgomery Jennings in memory of her husband, Colonel Robert H. Montgomery, and his love of palms and cycads. Located on 120 acres in Coral Gables, Florida, it includes the largest and finest private collections of palms and cycads in the world.

Selected publications 
 Montgomery, Robert Hiester. Auditing theory and practice. The Ronald press company, 1912.
 Montgomery, Robert Hiester. Income Tax Procedure. Ronald Press Company, 1921.
 Montgomery, R.H. Fifty Years of Accountancy. New York: Ronald Press, 1939.
 Bogen, Jules Irwin, and Robert Hiester Montgomery. Financial handbook. (1956).
 Defliese, P. L., Johnson, K. P., Montgomery, R. H., & Macleod, R. K. (1975). Auditing. Wiley.

References

Further reading 
 Burns, T.J., and E.N. Coffman. The Accounting Hall of Fame: Profiles of Fifty Members. Columbus: College of Business, Ohio State University, 1991.
 Krzystofik, A. "Robert Hiester Montgomery (1872-1953)," Accounting Historians Journal, 1974-1976, vol. 2 (1975), pp. 68–70.
 Roberts, A.R. Robert H. Montgomery: A Pioneer Leader of American Accounting. Atlanta: Business Publishing Division, Georgia State University, 1975.
 Alfred R. Roberts. "Roberts, A. R. "Montgomery, Robert Hiester (1872-1953)." In History of Accounting: An International Encyclopedia,] edited by Michael Chatfield and Richard Vangermeersch. New York: Garland Publishing, 1996. pp. 421–423.
 Zeff, S.A. "Leaders of the Accounting Profession: Fourteen Who Made a Difference," Journal of Accountancy, May 1987, pp. 46–71.

External links 
 Robert Hiester Montgomery in Accounting Hall of Fame.
 

1872 births
1953 deaths
American accountants
American business theorists
People from Mahanoy City, Pennsylvania
Writers from Pennsylvania